Hammerstad is a village in Eidsvoll municipality, Norway.

Its population in 1999 was 992, but since 2001 it is considered a part of the urban area Eidsvoll.

References

Villages in Akershus